Berdiansk Airport  is an airport in Berdiansk, Ukraine.

As of 26 February 2022, the airport is under Russian occupation.

As of January 2023, the airport is being used by the Russian Armed Forces.

Incidents and Accidents
 On 19 June 1987, Aeroflot Flight 528, a Yakovlev Yak-40 (CCCP-87826) approached the airport with a tailwind in a heavy rain shower and touched down at high speed. A go-around was initiated, then aborted. The aircraft overran the runway, struck obstacles and caught fire, killing eight aboard. The aircraft was written off.

References

Airports in Ukraine
Airports established in 1975
Berdiansk